The 1972 Jacksonville State Gamecocks football team represented Jacksonville State University as a member of the Gulf South Conference (GSC) during the 1972 NAIA Division I football season. Led by fourth-year head coach Charley Pell, the Gamecocks compiled an overall record of 7–2–1 with a mark of 4–1–1 in conference play, and finished third in the GSC.

Schedule

References

Jacksonville State
Jacksonville State Gamecocks football seasons
Jacksonville State Gamecocks football